The 1821 Alabama gubernatorial election was held on August 6, 1821, to elect the third governor of Alabama. Democratic-Republican candidate Israel Pickens defeated fellow Democratic-Republican candidate Henry H. Chambers with 57.43% of the vote.

General election

Candidates
Israel Pickens, US Representative for North Carolina 1811-1817
Henry H. Chambers, Delegate to the Alabama Constitutional Convention and Alabama House member in 1820

Results

County Results

Notes

References

Alabama gubernatorial elections
Alabama
1821 Alabama elections
August 1821 events